Catocala briseis, the Briseis underwing or ribbed underwing, is a moth of the family Erebidae. The species was first described by William Henry Edwards in 1864. It is found across the North American Boreal forest region from Newfoundland to the Pacific, south to Massachusetts and Pennsylvania.

The wingspan is 59–65 mm. Adults are on wing from July to September depending on the location.

The larvae feed on Populus species, including Populus tremuloides and Salix species.

References

Subspecies
Catocala briseis minerva, recorded from Utah, is now considered a synonym.

External links

Oehlke, Bill "Catocala briseis W.H. Edwards, 1864". Catocala. Archived from the original September 27, 2013.

briseis
Moths of North America
Moths described in 1864